Mutating Mutants is a role-playing game adventure published by TSR in 1990 for the Marvel Super Heroes role-playing game.

Contents
Mutating Mutants is an introductory scenario in which Wolverine tries to help the horribly transformed New Mutants.

Publication history
MLBA1 Mutating Mutants was written by Bruce Nesmith, with a cover by Jeff Butler, and was published by TSR, Inc., in 1990 as a 32-page book and an outer folder.

Reception

Reviews

References

Marvel Comics role-playing game adventures
Role-playing game supplements introduced in 1990